The Sea Cliff Firehouse is a historic fire station located at Sea Cliff, Nassau County, New York. The fire department was established in 1884, and the firehouse was built in 1931.  It is a 1 1/2-story, Tudor Revival style brick building with ornamental half timbering.  It has four engine bays with segmental arched openings and a steep slate roof with dormers.  It features a bell tower topped by a slate gable roof.

It was added to the National Register of Historic Places on May 18, 2003.

See also
National Register of Historic Places listings in Oyster Bay (town), New York

References

External links
Sea Cliff Fire Department (Official Village Site)

Fire stations on the National Register of Historic Places in New York (state)
Tudor Revival architecture in New York (state)
Fire stations completed in 1931
Buildings and structures in Nassau County, New York
National Register of Historic Places in Nassau County, New York